Trouble in Paradise is a 1932 American pre-Code romantic comedy film directed by Ernst Lubitsch and starring Miriam Hopkins, Kay Francis, and Herbert Marshall. Based on the 1931 play The Honest Finder (A Becsületes Megtaláló) by Hungarian playwright László Aladár, the lead characters are a gentleman thief and a lady pickpocket who join forces to con a beautiful woman who is the owner of a perfume company.

In 1991, Trouble in Paradise was selected for preservation by the United States National Film Registry by the Library of Congress as being "culturally, historically, or aesthetically significant".

Plot
In Venice, Gaston Monescu (Herbert Marshall), a master thief masquerading as a baron, meets Lily (Miriam Hopkins), a beautiful  pickpocket posing as a countess. The two fall in love and decide to team up. They leave Venice for Paris.

There, Gaston steals a diamond-encrusted purse worth 125,000 francs from Madame Mariette Colet (Kay Francis), owner of the famous perfume manufacturer Colet and Co. When Mariette offers a large reward for its return, Gaston claims it, giving the name of Lavalle.

While claiming the reward, Gaston charms Mariette, and admits to being broke. Mariette hires him as her private secretary. He arranges for Lily to be employed in Mariette's office, and stands up to Mariette's board of directors, led by Monsieur Adolph J. Giron (C. Aubrey Smith), the manager, who is openly suspicious of him.

Having observed Mariette open her private safe (and memorized the combination), Gaston persuades her that she should keep a large sum there, including half of her next dividend installment. Mariette begins to flirt with Gaston, and he begins to have feelings for her.

Unfortunately for the thieves, Mariette has two suitors: the Major (Charles Ruggles), and François Filiba (Edward Everett Horton), who was robbed in Venice by Gaston (posing as a doctor). François sees Gaston at a garden party, and is sure they have met, but can't immediately recall where. Fearing imminent discovery, Gaston and Lily decide to flee that night with what is in the safe, and not wait for the dividend installment.

Mariette is invited to a dinner party given by the Major. She cannot decide whether to go or to spend the night in bed with Gaston. Eventually she goes, but not before Lily catches on that Gaston has fallen for her rival, and wants to back out of the plan.

At the party, the Major tells François that he once mistook Gaston for a doctor, and François then recalls the Venice incident. François tells Mariette about Gaston, but she refuses to believe it's true.

Lily robs the safe after confronting her partner. Mariette returns home and suggestively probes Gaston, who admits that the safe has been cleaned out, but claims that he took the cash. He also tells her that Monsieur Giron has stolen millions from the firm over the years.

Lily then confronts Mariette and Gaston, admitting that it was she who stole the money from the safe.  She says at first that she doesn't want the money—then says she might as well get it in exchange for Gaston, and leaves. Gaston goes after Lily, then returns to say goodbye to Mariette.  He tells her that as marvelous as their affair would be, it would end with a policeman coming to arrest them both.  As he leaves, Gaston reveals that he took her pearl necklace—which he describes as her gift to Lily—which makes her smile.

In the taxi, facing a chilly Lily, Gaston reaches for his present, only to realize she's lifted it from his pocket.  Lily is at first triumphant, then realizes Gaston has lifted the money from her. This echoes their original meeting, when they first became partners in crime, and she embraces him in delight as the cab rolls away.

Cast
 Miriam Hopkins as Lily
 Kay Francis as Madame Colet
 Herbert Marshall as Gaston Monescu 
 Charles Ruggles as The Major (as Charlie Ruggles)
 Edward Everett Horton as François Filiba
 C. Aubrey Smith as Adolph J. Giron
 Robert Greig as Jacques (the Butler)

Production
Working titles for Trouble in Paradise included "The Honest Finder," "Thieves and Lovers," and "The Golden Widow"; the latter was publicly announced to be the intended release title. As with all the Lubitsch-Raphaelson collaborations, Lubitsch contributed to the writing and Raphaelson contributed ideas to the directing. Lubitsch did not receive screen credit for his writing, and Grover Jones, who was credited with the adaptation, did not contribute significantly: although he was in the room, his credit was based on a contractual obligation, and he did little more than tell stories. Further, although supposedly based on László Aladár's 1931 play The Honest Finder, Lubitsch suggested that Raphaelson not read the play, and instead the main character, Herbert Marshall's master thief, was based on the exploits of a real person, George Manolescu, a Romanian con man whose memoir was published in 1905, and became the basis for two silent films.

Made before effective enforcement of the Production Code, the film is an example of pre-Code cinema containing adult themes and sexual innuendo that was not permitted under the Code. In 1935, when the Production Code was being enforced, the film was not approved for reissue, and it was not seen again until 1968. Paramount was again rejected in 1943, when the studio wanted to make a musical version of the film.

The Art Deco sets for Trouble in Paradise were designed by the head of Paramount's art department, Hans Dreier, and the gowns were designed by Travis Banton.

Reception
Trouble in Paradise was the film that first had people talking about "the Lubitsch touch," and it was, in fact, one of the director's favorites. Critic Dwight Macdonald said of the film that it was "as close to perfection as anything I have ever seen in the movies." The New York Times named the film as one of the ten best films of 1932. In 1998, Roger Ebert added it to his Great Movies collection. Wes Anderson and Ralph Fiennes both said the movie was an inspiration for The Grand Budapest Hotel (2014). Review aggregation site Rotten Tomatoes reports an 89% approval based on 27 critics.

Awards and honors
Trouble in Paradise was named by the National Board of Review as one of the top 10 films of 1932.

Preservation 
Trouble in Paradise was preserved and restored by the UCLA Film & Television Archive and The Film Foundation from the 35mm nitrate studio print and a 35 mm acetate dupe negative.

References

External links

 
 
 
 
Trouble in Paradise: Lovers, On the Money an essay by Armond White at the Criterion Collection

1932 films
1932 romantic comedy films
American romantic comedy films
American black-and-white films
American crime comedy films
American films based on plays
Films directed by Ernst Lubitsch
Films set in Paris
Films set in Venice
Paramount Pictures films
United States National Film Registry films
Films about con artists
1930s English-language films
1930s American films